Parathanam is a Town at the base of Western Ghats mountain ranges in the Kottayam district, Kerala. It is 2,000 feet (610 m) above sea level and is situated on the eastern border of Kottayam District, 60 km from Kottayam, 12 km away from Poonjar and around 8 km away from Mundakayam on the NH 220 (Kottayam–Kumily Road).

Location 
This village is situated 8 km away from Mundakayam and 18 km away from Erattupetta close by. Sea View Estate UP School is one of the oldest upper primary schools in the Kottayam district.

Economy 
Rubber is a prime crop in Parathanam, one of the first places in India where it was cultivated. The Irish planter, John Joseph Murphy nurtured his rubber plantations here. The old-world charm of British plantations is still around, with purity of village life.

Parathanam can be reached from Kochi International Airports via Pala and Thiruvananthapuram International Airports via Kottayam or Pathanamthitta. All the buses to Erattupetta and Mundakayam pass through Parathanam.

Schools 
1. Sea View Estate UP School

2. St. Alphonsa Nursery School

Hospitals 
1. Primary Health Center, Parathanam

2. Government Veterinary Hospital

Banks 
1. Mundakayam Co-Operative Bank, Parathanam (Branch)

Churches 
1. MOTHER OF SEVEN DOLOURS CHURCH, PARATHANAM

Temples 
1. Sri Durga Devi Temple, Parathanam

How to Reach 
 Kottayam - Ponkunnam - Kanjirappally - Parathanam
 Kochi/Cochin -Thalayolapparambu - Ettumanoor-Pala - Erattupetta - Poonjar - Parathanam
 Thiruvananthapuram - Kottarakkara - Adoor - Pathanamthitta - Ranni - Erumeli - Parathanam
 Thekkady - Kumily -Vandiperiyar-Peerumedu-Kuttikkanam- Mundakayam-Parathanam
 Angamaly - Muvattupuzha -Thodupuzha-Erattupetta-Poonjar-Parathanam
 Sabarimala - Pampa - Erumely  - Parathanam

AC Volvo bus service is available from Technopark to Mundakayam, by KSRTC.

Nearest Airport 
Cochin International Airport

Nearest Railway Station 
Kottayam

References 

 Parathanam । പറത്താനം
 Mother of Seven Dolours Church Parathanam::Palai Eparchy:: Syro Malabar Church Parish
 Pin Code: PARATHANAM, KOTTAYAM, KERALA, India, Pincode.net.in
 Parathanam Pin Code, Parathanam , Kottayam Map , Latitude and Longitude , Kerala

Cities and towns in Kottayam district